Columbia station is a historic train station and headquarters of Columbia Transit located in Columbia, Missouri.  The building was constructed in 1909 as the terminus of the Columbia spur of the Wabash Railroad (now Columbia Terminal Railroad). It is a one-story, H plan, Tudor Revival style building constructed of locally quarried rock faced ashlar cut stone.  In 2007, the building underwent renovation and restoration and was expanded to accommodate offices for Columbia's public transportation. The project, costing over $2.5 million, was intended to make the station a multi-model transportation center. It was certified at the LEED (Leadership in Energy and Environmental Design) Silver Level, meaning it meets national standards for energy efficiency and sustainable construction.  The station is the busiest bus stop in Columbia and served as a pickup point for Megabus until September of 2015.

The property was listed on the National Register of Historic Places in 1979 as the Wabash Railroad Station and Freight House. It is located in the North Village Arts District.

References

Railway stations on the National Register of Historic Places in Missouri
Railway freight houses on the National Register of Historic Places
Former Wabash Railroad stations
Former railway stations in Missouri
Rail transportation in Columbia, Missouri
Buildings and structures in Columbia, Missouri
Railway stations in the United States opened in 1909
National Register of Historic Places in Boone County, Missouri